Hugh Casey may refer to:
 Hugh Casey (baseball) (1913–1951), Major League Baseball pitcher
 Hugh Casey (politician) (1927–2013), politician in Northern Ireland
 Hugh Carey (soldier) (1840–1886), soldier in the Union Army
 Hugh Boyd Casey (1925–1952), United States Army officer
 Hugh John Casey (1898–1981), his father, United States Army officer